William Michael Joensen (born July 8, 1960)  is an American prelate of the Roman Catholic Church who has been serving as the bishop of the Diocese of Des Moines since 2019.

Biography

Early life and education
William Joensen was born on July 8, 1960, in Waterloo, Iowa to Alfred W. Joensen and Marilyn E. (née Simington) Joensen. He is the eldest of five children and grew up in Ames, Iowa. Joensen received a Bachelor of Science degree in zoology from Iowa State University in Ames, Iowa. He was attending medical school at the University of Iowa in Iowa City, Iowa, when he decided instead to study for the priesthood. Joensen's seminary education was at the Pontifical College Josephinum in Columbus, Ohio.

Priesthood
On June 24, 1989, Joensen was ordained to the priesthood for the Archdiocese of Dubuque by Archbishop Daniel Kucera in the Church of the Nativity in Dubuque.

Joensen spent six years in parish ministry and education before returning to graduate studies. During those years he served as the associate pastor of Sacred Heart Parish and on the faculty of Columbus High School in Waterloo from 1989 to 1992. From 1992 to 1995 he was the associate pastor of the Church of the Resurrection Parish in Dubuque. Joensen earned a Doctor of Philosophy degree from the Catholic University of America in Washington, D.C. in 2001.

When Joensen returned to Iowa, he served as a chaplain at Clarke College in Dubuque from 2003 to 2010. At Loras College in Dubuque, Joensen served as chaplain, associate professor of philosophy, and dean of campus spiritual life. At Dubuque's St. Pius X Seminary Joensen was the spiritual director. Joensen also served as a faculty member at the Tertio Millennio Seminar on the Free Society, which focuses on Catholic social teaching, in Krakow, Poland.

Bishop of Des Moines
Pope Francis appointed Joensen as the tenth bishop for the Diocese of Des Moines on July 18, 2019. His episcopal ordination took place on September 27, 2019, at St. Francis of Assisi Church in West Des Moines, Iowa. Archbishop Michael Jackels was the consecrator, with Bishop R. Walker Nickless and Bishop Thomas Zinkula as the co-consecrators.

See also

 Catholic Church hierarchy
 Catholic Church in the United States
 Historical list of the Catholic bishops of the United States
 List of Catholic bishops of the United States
 Lists of patriarchs, archbishops, and bishops

References

 

1960 births
Living people
People from Waterloo, Iowa
People from Ames, Iowa
Roman Catholic bishops of Des Moines
Roman Catholic Archdiocese of Dubuque
21st-century Roman Catholic bishops in the United States
Iowa State University alumni
Pontifical College Josephinum alumni
Catholic University of America alumni
Loras College faculty
Bishops appointed by Pope Francis